This is a list of Swedish destroyers commissioned between 1902 and 1959. The Swedish Navy has once re-numbered all its destroyers. Some ships were assigned hull numbers, which were later changed. Other ships have generally been issued a number, but never wore it.

By hull number

Notes

 Destroyers
Destroyer
Sweden
Destroyers list